Ashiana Housing Ltd. (AHL) is an Indian real estate development company established in 1986 and headquartered in New Delhi, India. The firm is a real estate company that was recognized by Forbes as Asia's 200 Best Under A Billion in 2010 and 2011. Ashiana Housing is a middle income housing developer with a primary focus on Child Centric Homes, Senior Living, Care Homes (i.e., assisted living) and comfort homes. The company has expanded its reach from group housing to facility management, retail, and hotels, as well as maintenance and resale of the property after possession.

History
Ashiana Housing Ltd. is involved in middle to upper-middle income residential housing projects in satellite cities and towns in India– around industrial hubs – predominantly along the Delhi-Mumbai industrial corridor being promoted by the Government of India. Its residential real estate development projects range from apartments to group housing projects. In addition, it also develops limited retail and commercial properties, including hotels as well as retirement homes for senior citizens.

The company was incorporated on 25 June 1986, under the Companies Act, 1956, as Ashiana Housing & Finance (India) Limited. Subsequently, the name of the company was changed to its present name in the year 2007.

As of 31 December 2014, the company completed 24 residential developments and 6 commercial developments, aggregating 10.74 million square feet of saleable area. Its ongoing projects include:
 13 projects comprising 11 residential developments and 2 commercial developments, aggregating approximately 6.38 million square feet of saleable area
 15 future projects comprising 13 residential developments and 2 commercial developments, aggregating approximately 8.40 million square feet of saleable area

Sponsorships and Joint Ventures

On 4 January 2010, Ashiana announced a joint venture with the Manglam group in Jaipur for the development of 31 acres of land. The Ashiana Manglam partnership built several projects in Jaipur.

Ashiana Housing raised Rs 200 crore from Goldman Sachs and Creador by way of Qualified Institutional Placement of its equity shares in February 2015.

In June 2015, Ashiana joined Escapade Real Estate, a part of Arihant Foundations, to launch a housing project called "Ashiana Shubham" for senior living and normal housing, in Chennai.

In July 2015, Ashiana signed a partnership deal with Shriram Properties to develop a housing project in Kolkata. Through this partnership with Bengal Shriram Hi-Tech City Pvt. Ltd. (a group company of Shriram Properties Ltd.), the company will develop senior living as well as regular housing on 19.72 acres of land.

Financial Summary
 
During the fiscal year 2014–15, Ashiana's net profit doubled to Rs 46.49 crore from Rs 21.86 crore (the previous fiscal year). Income from operations increased to Rs 142.70 crore from Rs 110.65 crore. The company claims to have raised Rs 200 crore in 2015 from investors through Qualified Institutional Placement. In the fiscal year 2012–13, the company posted a profit after tax of Rs. 33.2 crore.  The company reported a 61% increase in revenues (sales & other income) in 2011–12 over the previous financial year (2010–11).

Company Leadership 

Vishal Gupta – Managing Director, looks after the general management of company affairs including finance, engineering and architecture, and project execution.

Ankur Gupta – Joint Managing Director, leads the marketing, HR and IT functions of the company

Varun Gupta – Director, leads the  land and finance division of the company

Corporate social responsibility
Ashiana Training Institute: Aside from providing employment to thousands of unskilled and semi-skilled workers and migrant laborers at its construction sites, the company provides skill training (plumbing, electrical and masonry) to help laborers earn better wages.

Phoolwari: Ashiana Housing started a day-care initiative for the children of laborers working at construction sites named Ashiana Phoolwari, focusing on child hygiene, health, well-being, and education.

Women Empowerment: The company provides skill training programs for women laborers to help them earn equal wages (to men) and improve their job prospects. It also sponsors a monthly Panchayati Raj Training Programme for elected women representatives in partnership with Kiran Bedi's Navjyoti Foundation.

Environmental Efforts: As part of its corporate social responsibility towards the environment, the company follows best practices for solid waste management, optimal use of natural resources, and extensive planting of trees on all Ashiana properties.

Awards and recognition

References

External links
 

Real estate companies of India
Real estate companies established in 1986
Companies based in New Delhi
Companies listed on the National Stock Exchange of India
Companies listed on the Bombay Stock Exchange